Johann von Trarbach (known as Jost Maurer) was a German mason, architect and construction entrepreneur. His nickname means 'Jost, the stonemason' in German.

Jost Maurer carried out the expansion of the Wolf monastery (north of Traben-Trarbach) around 1498 and erected the portico on the Trarbach church in 1518.

References

Architects from Rhineland-Palatinate
Year of birth missing
Year of death missing